Scott Phillips may refer to:

Scott Phillips (musician) (born 1973), American musician and songwriter
Scott Phillips (writer) (born 1961), American writer primarily of crime fiction in the noir tradition
Scott Phillips (cricketer), Welsh cricketer
Scott Phillips (Home and Away), fictional character on the Australian soap opera Home and Away